Okolona College, also known as Okolona Industrial School, and Okolona Normal & Industrial School, was a college for African Americans in Okolona, Mississippi, Chickasaw County, Mississippi. It was added to the National Register of Historic Places on August 9, 2002. The school is located on Mississippi Highway 245 1.1 miles north of the junction with Mississippi Highway 32 and Mississippi Highway 41. It is part of The Okolona College Historic District.

The school was founded in 1902 by Wallace A. Battle and closed its doors in 1965, when the passage of the civil rights resulted in the shift of African-Americans to public education. It was built on a civil war battleground. Four campus buildings survive:  Abbott Hall, McDougall Hall, the Vocational Agriculture Building and the T. D. Bratton Memorial Dormitory. A gazebo and the ruins of a dormitory also survive. Brick piers marks the three campus entrances and a neon sign marked the north entrance.

Abbott Hall was built c. 1929–1930 and is a one-story brick and stucco building with seven bays and a side-gabled roof. It contained four classrooms, the school  president's office a reception room, and registrar's office.

McDougatt Hall dates to c. 1931 and is a two-story painted brick building. The building's first floor contained a chapel and the chaplain's office as well as space for the business manager and dean. The second floor was used for the nurse's office and health department, science department, economics department and a guest room.

Bratton Memorial Dormitory, also known as Bratton Hall, was built c. 1950s is a brick building with two wings. It was a women's dormitory and housed the school's laundry facilities and cafeteria.

The Vocational Agriculture Building was built c. 1950 and is a one-story brick building with gabled portico over brick columns. It was built on the site of the Robert Patton Library and Old Okolona Hall which burned sometime after 1945.

The dormitory building was constructed c. 1950 and is a one-story brick structure.

Notable people
William Raspberry, nationally syndicated columnist.
Effie T. Battle, poet, Okolona College president.

See also
National Register of Historic Places listings in Mississippi#Chickasaw County

References

School buildings on the National Register of Historic Places in Mississippi
Historic districts on the National Register of Historic Places in Mississippi
National Register of Historic Places in Chickasaw County, Mississippi
Educational institutions established in 1902
1902 establishments in Mississippi
Educational institutions disestablished in 1965
1965 disestablishments in Mississippi
Historically black universities and colleges in the United States
Defunct universities and colleges in Mississippi
Schools in Chickasaw County, Mississippi
Modern Movement architecture in the United States
University and college buildings on the National Register of Historic Places in Mississippi
University and college buildings completed in 1929